Fabio Brunelli (11 May 1969 – 7 March 2021) was a Brazilian news anchor, journalist, and writer.

Biography
Brunelli first appeared on national television at the age of 20, the youngest Brazilian anchorman to do so. He debuted on Rede Manchete on 9 November 1989 to cover the Fall of the Berlin Wall.

In September 2009, Brunelli released his first novel, titled . Fabio Brunelli died of cancer in Resende on 7 March 2021 at the age of 51.

References

1969 births
2021 deaths
Writers from São Paulo
Brazilian television news anchors
Brazilian journalists
21st-century Brazilian novelists
Deaths from cancer in Rio de Janeiro (state)